Legendary Years is a compilation album by Italian symphonic power metal band Rhapsody of Fire. It consists of re-recorded songs from The Emerald Sword Saga, a five concept albums-long story started in their first album Legendary Tales in 1997 and concluded in Power of the Dragonflame in 2002.

It is their first work with singer Giacomo Voli and drummer Manu Lotter, replacing longtime members Fabio Lione and Alex Holzwarth respectively. It also mark the band's first album (and first record since 1995) not to feature Lione, and the first without Holzwarth since their 1998 studio album Symphony of Enchanted Lands.

Track listing

Personnel 
All information from the album booklet.

Rhapsody of Fire
 Alex Staropoli – keyboards, production, engineering, editing
 Roberto De Micheli – guitars
 Alessandro Sala – bass
 Giacomo Voli – lead vocals, choir vocals, conductor (choir)
 Manu Lotter – drums

Additional musicians
 Manuel Staropoli – baroque recorder, baroque oboe, flute
 Massimo Marchese – lute
 Teodora Tommasi – celtic harp
 Elisa Frausin – cello
 Elisa Verzier – vocals (alto)
 Riccardo Rados – vocals (tenor)
 Hao Wang – vocals (bass)
 Matjaž Zobec – vocals (bass)
 Paola Marra – vocals (soprano)
 Galateia Mastichidou – vocals (soprano)

Choir
 Paolo Ribaldini, Davide Moras, Fabio Sambenini, Gabriele Gozzi, Alex Mari, Marco Sandron

Production
 Sebastian "Seeb" Levermann – engineering, editing, mixing, mastering, recording
 Massimo Goina – photography
 Paul Thureau – layout
 Luca Balboa – conductor
 Alexandre Charleux – cover art

References 

2017 albums
AFM Records albums
Rhapsody of Fire albums